Olga Lezhneva (Olga Levit) (born 6 May 1983) is a Ukrainian film, and television actress.

Biography
Olga Lezhneva (Olga Levit) was born on 6 May 1983 in Kharkiv, Ukraine (Ukrainian SSR), to  factory workers Russian father and Ukrainian mother. In 2006, she moved with her family to the Capital of Ukraine, Kyiv.  She moved to New York City, USA in 2014.

Education
 2000-2006 Kharkiv National Kotlyarevsky University of Arts. Theatre Faculty. Performing skills Department.
 2007-2011 Kyiv International University. Institute of Linguistics and Psychology. Psychology Department.

Career
In 2000, at the age of 16, she worked as a talk show host on the TV-Channel "Tonis".
She then starred in Ukrainian sketch shows "The Office" (2005) and "Jokes on Target" (2006), which aired on the TV-Cannel "Simon".

Olga subsequently appeared in supporting roles in Ukrainian-Russian films "Antisniper" (2007)" and 
"The Rules of Hijacking" (2008). She starred in the film "Like hell!" (2008). She made guest appearance in  "The Taxi-2" and played the role of a sexy conductor in the Ukrainian comedy  "1+1 at home" (2013).

She became known for portraying Beatrice on the Ukrainian television sitcom "House arrest" (2010) for two seasons and for the role of Ludochka in the Russian comedy "What Men Talk About" (2010). 
She appeared on the TV show "The Affair" (2014) and "Return to Montauk" (2016).

Theatre
 2006 — «The house of Bernarda Alba» by  Federico García Lorca — Adela
 2006 — «The Orchestra» by Jean Anouilh — Leon
 2006 — «The Team» by Semyon Zlotnikov — Nadia Hollywood

Filmography

External links 

Olga Lezhneva. Encyclopedia of Film and TV
 KinoPoisk.ru Olga Lezhneva
 Olga Lezhneva. The official site of TV-Series House Arest.

References

1983 births
Living people
Ukrainian film actresses
Ukrainian television actresses
21st-century Ukrainian actresses
Ukrainian emigrants to the United States
Actors from Kharkiv